State Route 23 (SR 23) is a  state highway in St. Clair County. The highway serves as a connector between U.S. Route 11 (US 11) in Springville and US 231/US 411 in Ashville. Although signed as a north–south route, the orientation of SR 23 is virtually east–west. Besides the intersections with US 11 and US 231/US 411, the only other route that SR 23 intersects is Interstate 59 (I-59) near Springville.

History
Prior to 1953, SR 23 was concurrent with US 11 between Springville and Gadsden, and with US 411 between Gadsden and Centre.  Northeast of Centre, SR 23 continued along the route of present-day SR 9. By 1956, the route assumed its current alignment.

Major intersections

See also

References

External links

023
Transportation in St. Clair County, Alabama